Personality crisis may refer to one or more personality problems:
 Existential crisis
 Identity crisis, undeveloped or confused identity
 Midlife crisis

It may also refer to:
 Personality Crisis (band), a Canadian punk rock group
 Personality Crisis, an album by The Bear Quartet
 "Personality Crisis" (song), the lead track from the New York Dolls' self titled debut album